Manitha Jaathi is a 1991 Indian Tamil language film, directed and produced by P. Kalaimani. The film stars Sivakumar, Ramki, Nirosha and Ravichandran.

Cast
Sivakumar
Ramki
Nirosha
Ravichandran

Soundtrack
The music was composed by Ilaiyaraaja.

References

External links
 

1991 films
Films scored by Ilaiyaraaja
1990s Tamil-language films